The Law That Divides is a 1918 American silent drama film directed by Howard M. Mitchell and starring Kathleen Clifford, Kenneth Harlan and Gordon Sackville.

Cast
 Kathleen Clifford as Kathleen Preston
 Kenneth Harlan as Howard Murray
 Gordon Sackville as John Douglas
 Corinne Grant as Mrs. Douglas
 Patrick Calhoun as Kenneth Douglas
 Scott Pembroke as Jack Baggot 
 Ruth Lackaye as Mrs. Baggot
 Mabel Hyde as Mrs. Preston

References

Bibliography
 John T. Weaver. Twenty Years of Silents, 1908-1928. Scarecrow Press, 1971.

External links
 

1918 films
1918 drama films
1910s English-language films
American silent feature films
Silent American drama films
American black-and-white films
Films directed by Howard M. Mitchell
Films distributed by W. W. Hodkinson Corporation
1910s American films